Philipp Crone (born 16 March 1977 in Cologne) is a German former field hockey player who competed in the 2000 Summer Olympics and in the 2004 Summer Olympics.

After his time in sports, he worked as journalist for different German newspapers like Sueddeutsche Zeitung and for Bayerischer Rundfunk.

References

External links

1977 births
Living people
German male field hockey players
Olympic field hockey players of Germany
Field hockey players at the 2000 Summer Olympics
Field hockey players at the 2004 Summer Olympics
Olympic bronze medalists for Germany
Olympic medalists in field hockey
Sportspeople from Cologne
Medalists at the 2004 Summer Olympics
1998 Men's Hockey World Cup players
2002 Men's Hockey World Cup players
2006 Men's Hockey World Cup players
Süddeutsche Zeitung people
German male journalists
German journalists
German newspaper journalists
Bayerischer Rundfunk people
21st-century German people